Pedro Delgado was a Venezuelan footballer who ended his career with Carrick Rangers in Northern Ireland.

Club career
He started his career as a central midfielder at Colegio San Ignacio de Loyola. He represented Venezuela at youth level - U-14, U-15 and U-17 including participation in the same South American Cup at which Ronaldo made his Brazil debut.

Following his stint as a player under a full athletic scholarship at the University of Evansville, where he was a 4 time student-athlete All America selection and named to the Missouri Valley Conference team of the century, he played for Deportivo Galicia and Deportivo Táchira Fútbol Club in his homeland. While playing for Deportivo Táchira Fútbol Club he made a few appearances in the Copa Libertadores.

In Northern Ireland, he played for Linfield FC, Dungannon Swifts FC, Carrick Rangers FC and for Larne.

References

Year of birth missing (living people)
Living people
Venezuelan footballers
Deportivo Táchira F.C. players
Linfield F.C. players
Dungannon Swifts F.C. players
Larne F.C. players
Carrick Rangers F.C. players
Venezuelan expatriate footballers
Expatriate association footballers in Northern Ireland
Venezuelan expatriate sportspeople in the United Kingdom
Association football midfielders